Sébastien Fournet-Fayard (born 25 April 1985) is a French road cyclist, who currently rides for Pro Immo Nicolas Roux.

Major results
2007
 3rd Overall Cinturó de l'Empordà
 4th Chrono des Nations U23
 6th Overall Ronde de l'Isard
2015
 6th Overall Tour de Guadeloupe
 8th Overall Grand Prix Chantal Biya
2016
 5th Overall Tour de Guadeloupe
1st Stage 2b (ITT)
2017
 1st  Overall Tour de Guadeloupe
1st Stage 8b (ITT)
 1st  Mountains classification Tour du Jura
2018
 7th Overall Tour de Guadeloupe
1st Stage 8b (ITT)

References 

French male cyclists
1985 births
Living people
Sportspeople from Clermont-Ferrand
Cyclists from Auvergne-Rhône-Alpes
20th-century French people
21st-century French people